U.S. Route 51 (US 51), mostly overlapped by the unsigned State Route 3 (SR 3), is a north–south state highway in the U.S. state of Tennessee, that is 135.9 miles (218.71 km) long, completely within West Tennessee. It begins in Shelby County and ends in Obion County. The SR 3 designation is seen largely on mileposts.

The two places where US 51 and SR 3 differ are in Memphis, where US 51 has been moved to Danny Thomas Boulevard (State Route 1 / State Route 4), while SR 3 remains on the one-way pair of 2nd and 3rd Streets, and in South Fulton, where US 51 crosses the state line on State Route 215 to the Purchase Parkway, while SR 3 remains on the old road, now U.S. Route 45.

Route description
US 51 enters Tennessee at Memphis and runs north through the cities of Millington, Munford, Atoka, Brighton, Covington, Henning, Ripley, Halls, Dyersburg, Troy, Union City, and South Fulton.  This highway crosses four interstate highways on its journey through the state and actually crosses Interstate 240 twice within the City of Memphis but interchanges with it only at Union Avenue.  US 51 is the westernmost south–north United States Highway in the State of Tennessee.  US 51 is an interstate standard facility from Dyersburg to South of Troy and then resuming interstate standard status north of Union City to South Fulton.  US 51 is a four-lane or larger facility throughout the state with some sections north of Dyersburg carrying a  speed limit.

Near Henning is also the site of the Hatchie River Bridge collapse on April 1, 1989 that killed 8 motorists when 3 spans of the structure collapsed. Its collapse was the result of pier scour and movement of the river channel.

US 51 carries the Tennessee Scenic Parkway designation from its junction with SR 385 in Millington to SR 104 in Dyersburg and also carries the Great River Road designation from US 64/US 70/US 79 in Memphis to SR 88 in Halls.

History

Historic two-lane alignments of this highway from Henning north are represented by State Route 209, a portion of State Route 88, State Route 210, State Route 211, a portion of State Route 183 and State Route 184.  From Memphis to Henning, most of the original two lane road was upgraded to four lane expressway in the 1960s.

Future

Most of US 51 north of Dyersburg is expected to be upgraded as part of future Interstate 69.  Plans currently call for Interstate 69 to run along the existing US 51 freeway from Dyersburg to Troy and from Union City to South Fulton.  This section is part of SIU 7 for Interstate 69 and will require few changes beyond resigning the existing highway, however, a bypass route around Troy and Union City will need to be built before this section of future Interstate 69 is completed.

Major intersections

Dyersburg business route

U.S. Route 51 Business (US 51 Bus.) is a  business route of US 51 located entirely in the city of Dyersburg in Dyer County. It has the unsigned designation of State Route 211 (SR 211) for its entire length.

The highway begins as South Main Avenue at a large three-way intersection with US 51/SR 3 on the southern edge of the city. It heads north, concurrent with SR 211, as a two-lane road through a business district before traveling through wooded areas and crossing a bridge over the North Fork of the Forked Deer River into downtown. US 51 Bus./SR 211 pass by the Dyer County Courthouse and becomes concurrent with SR 104 (East Court Street) as the road becomes North Main Avenue shortly before making an abrupt left turn onto McGaughey Street. US 51 Bus./SR 211 then split before heading through neighborhoods along Troy Avenue before turning right onto Gordon Street. The highway then makes a left turn onto North Sampson Avenue and passes through more neighborhoods before merging onto St. John Avenue. They then travel through a business district before widening to a four-lane highway and coming to an end at an intersection with US 51/SR 3, where US 51 Bus. ends and SR 211 follows northbound US 51/SR 3 north on St. John Avenue.

See also

List of highways numbered 51

References

External links
 

51
Interstate 69
051
Transportation in Shelby County, Tennessee
Transportation in Tipton County, Tennessee
Transportation in Lauderdale County, Tennessee
Transportation in Dyer County, Tennessee
Transportation in Obion County, Tennessee
 Tennessee
Freeways in Tennessee
Transportation in Memphis, Tennessee